Malka Older is an American author, academic, and humanitarian aid worker. She was named the 2015 Senior Fellow for Technology and Risk at the Carnegie Council for Ethics in International Affairs, and has more than eight years' experience in humanitarian aid and development.

Her first novel, Infomocracy (2016), is the first in the series The Centenal Cycle, which also included Null States (2017) and State Tectonics (2018), which won a Prometheus Award in 2019.

Education 
Older holds an undergraduate degree in literature from Harvard University, a master's degree in international relations and economics from the School of Advanced International Studies (SAIS) of Johns Hopkins University, and a doctoral degree from the Institut d'Études Politiques de Paris (Sciences Po). Her doctoral work explored the dynamics of multi-level governance and disaster response using the cases of Hurricane Katrina and the 2011 Tōhoku tsunami in Japan.

Career 
Older is currently a Faculty Associate at Arizona State University's School for the Future of Innovation in Society. She has more than a decade of experience in humanitarian aid and development, ranging from field level experience as a Head of Office in Darfur to supporting global programs and agency-wide strategy as a disaster risk reduction technical specialist. In between, she has designed and implemented economic development initiatives in post-disaster context, supervised a large and diverse portfolio as Director of Programs in Indonesia, and responded to complex emergencies and natural disasters in Sri Lanka, Uganda, Darfur, Indonesia, Japan, and Mali, in the last three as Team Leader.

Bibliography 
 Centenal Cycle Trilogy
 Infomocracy. Tor, 2016. , 
 Null States. Tor, 2017. , 
 State Tectonics. Tor, 2018. , 
 Ebooks
 Tear Tracks. Tor, 2015
 Trade Deal (Born to the Blade, Season 1 Episode 5). Serial Box, 2018
 Assassination (Born to the Blade, Season 1 Episode 9). Serial Box, 2018
 Ninth Step Station. Serial Box, 2019
 Machina. Serial Box, 2020
 Orphan Black: The Next Chapter. Serial Box, 2019
 Other Works
 ...and Other Disasters. Mason Jar Press, 2019. 
 What We Believe About Our Institutions, New York Times, 2021 ISSN 0362-4331
 The Mimicking of Known Successes. Tor, 2023. ,

Awards and recognition 
 Named one of Kirkus Reviewss "Best Fiction of 2016" 
 One of The Washington Posts "Best Science Fiction and Fantasy of 2016" 
 Finalist for the 2017 John W. Campbell Award for Best New Writer

References

External links

21st-century American women writers
Cyberpunk writers
Living people
Year of birth missing (living people)
Women science fiction and fantasy writers
Paul H. Nitze School of Advanced International Studies alumni
Harvard University alumni